Broken Spoke Record is a record label founded in 1997 by Royce Nunley, who was then a member of The Suicide Machines and side-project Broken Spoke.  The label had releases from artists such as Agent 23, Tricky Dick and Blueprint 76.

Broken Spoke Records was founded by James M White in Austin, Texas in the 1980s. James M White, who passed away in 2021, was also the co-owner of the famous Broken Spoke dancehall in Austin, founded in 1964 by James M White's stepfather William Richard "Joe" Baland.

See also
 List of record labels

American record labels
Record labels established in 1997